Gilles Barbier,  (born in 1965, Vanuatu) is a contemporary artist.

Exhibitions
 Le Cockpit, le Vaisseau, ce que l'on voit depuis le hublot, Espace Claude Berri, Paris, 2008
 Gilles Barbier, Galerie Vallois, Paris, 2007
 Gilles Barbier, curator: F. Cohen, Carré d'Art, France, 2006
 Marcel Duchamp Prize exhibition, Paris, 2005
 Gilles Barbier, Kunstverein Freiburg, Freibourg, Germany, 2004
 Gilles Barbier, Galerie Vallois, Paris, 2003
 Picnic Along the Path, Rena Bransten Gallery, San Francisco
 Le Bénévolat dans l'action, Galerie Vallois, 2001
 Pique-nique au bord du chemin, MAC Marseille, France 2001
 Jour de fête, Centre Georges Pompidou, Paris, 2000
 One Man Show, Galerie Vallois, Paris, 2000
 Venice Biennale, 1999
 Copywork: The Dictionary Pages and Other Diversions, curator: Diana C. du Pont, Santa Barbara Museum of Art, Santa Barbara, 1999
 Clones, Henry Art Gallery, Seattle, 1999
 Environnements corrigés, Espai Lucas, Valencia, Spain, 1999
 Hyper désir, Galerie Vallois, 1999
 Aux armes, etc., Kunstlerwerkstatt, Munich, 1998
 L'Autre, 4e Contemporary Art Biennale, Lyon, 1997
 Containerize, Kunst-Werke, Berlin 1997
 Les Pages Roses: Eine Kopie der Welt von A-Aa, Offenes Kulturhaus, Linz, Austria, 1996
 Comment mieux guider notre vie au quotidien, Galerie Vallois, Paris, 1995

Decorations 
 Chevalier of the Order of Arts and Letters (2016)

References

External links
Rena Bransten Gallery (San Francisco)
Review in Frieze Magazine
Profile on ArtSlant
Exhibition at Santa Barbara Museum of Art
Galerie Vallois  (Paris)
La force de l'art 02 

Living people
Vanuatuan artists
1965 births
French contemporary artists
Chevaliers of the Ordre des Arts et des Lettres